Robert Meade (Buzz) Sawyer (born November 18, 1962) is a former American football punter in the National Football League for the Dallas Cowboys. He played college football at Baylor University.

Early years
Sawyer attended Waxahachie High School. He accepted a football scholarship from Baylor University. He became a starter at punter as a sophomore, posting 45 punts for 1,178 yards (26.2-yard avg.).

As a junior, Sawyer tallied 73 punts for 3,275 yards, a 44.9-yard average (school record and led the conference) and seven punts of 60-plus yards (school record). As a senior, he registered 52 punts for 2,332 yards (44.8-yard avg.). At the time, he held the school career record for punting average (43.4) and the school's top two punting seasons.

Professional career

Atlanta Falcons
Although he was selected by the San Antonio Gunslingers in the 1985 USFL Territorial Draft, Sawyer opted to sign as an undrafted free agent by the Atlanta Falcons after the 1986 NFL Draft. He was waived on August 5.

Dallas Cowboys
In 1987, Sawyer signed as a free agent with the Dallas Cowboys. He was waived on August 31.

After the NFLPA strike was declared on the third week of the season, those contests were canceled (reducing the 16 game season to 15) and the NFL decided that the games would be played with replacement players. Sawyer was re-signed in September to be a part of the Dallas replacement team that was given the mock name "Rhinestone Cowboys" by the media. He started 3 games at punter, making 16 punts for 639 yards, with a long of 54 yards and a 39.9-yard average. He was released on October 20, at the end of the strike.

Golf career 
After retirement from football Sawyer took up golf around the Houston area playing in many local tournaments.  On weekends Sawyer, or Buzz as his golfing buddies like to call him, can be frequently found playing a game of Wolf Hammer.

References

1962 births
Living people
People from Waxahachie, Texas
Waxahachie High School alumni
Players of American football from Texas
American football punters
Baylor Bears football players
Dallas Cowboys players
National Football League replacement players